Robert Glozier (born 20 November 1948) is an English former footballer who played as a full back.

Career
After joining the club as an apprentice, Glozier signed professional forms with West Ham United in 1966. In 1969, following failure to make a first team appearance for West Ham, Glozier joined Torquay United. During three years at the club, Glozier made 57 Football League, scoring once. On 25 October 1972, Glozier was awarded a testimonial by Torquay following a cruciate ligament injury. Following his spell at Torquay, Glozier dropped into non-League football, playing for Guildford City, Dartford, Dover, Maidstone United, Gravesend & Northfleet and Hastings United. In 1983, Glozier joined Crawley Town, making 132 league appearances, scoring twice, over the course of three years. Glozier later joined Bishop's Stortford and Chelmsford City, making a singular emergency league appearance for the latter, becoming one of the club's oldest players in the process.

Following his playing days, Glozier temporarily took up the role of caretaker manager at former club Gravesend & Northfleet.

References

1948 births
Living people
Association football defenders
English footballers
English football managers
Footballers from East Ham
West Ham United F.C. players
Torquay United F.C. players
Guildford City F.C. players
Dartford F.C. players
Dover F.C. players
Maidstone United F.C. (1897) players
Ebbsfleet United F.C. players
Hastings United F.C. (1948) players
Crawley Town F.C. players
Bishop's Stortford F.C. players
Chelmsford City F.C. players
Ebbsfleet United F.C. managers
English Football League players